Andrew Sutherland may refer to:

 Andrew Sutherland (mathematician), American mathematician specializing in number theory
 Andrew Sutherland (politician) (1882–1961), New Zealand politician